This is Ashraf Uddin Khan,  who is a Bangladesh Nationalist Party politician.

He is the former Member of Parliament of Mymensingh-15.

Career
Khan was elected to parliament from Mymensingh-15 as a Bangladesh Nationalist Party candidate in 1979.

References

Bangladesh Nationalist Party politicians
Living people
2nd Jatiya Sangsad members
4th Jatiya Sangsad members
Year of birth missing (living people)